Oberelsaß (or Upper Alsace) was the southern part of the historical region Alsace or Elsass, inhabited originally by locals speaking Alemannic German. From 1871 to 1918, Bezirk Oberelsaß was a region (Bezirk) in the southern part of the province of Elsaß-Lothringen in the German Empire. The region corresponds exactly to the current French department of Haut-Rhin. Its capital was Colmar. It was divided into the districts (Kreise) of:
 Altkirch within the Sundgau
 Colmar
 Gebweiler (Guebwiller)
 Mülhausen (Mulhouse)
 Rappoltsweiler (Ribeauvillé)
 Thann

The flag of Oberelsaß is a yellow bar on a red field decorated on each side with three crowns. The combination of this flag with that of Unterelsaß forms the flag of modern Alsace.

History of Alsace
Former government regions of Germany
1871 establishments in Germany